Ride the Tiger may refer to: 

Ride the Tiger (album), by Yo La Tengo
"Ride the Tiger", a song from the album Dragon Fly by Jefferson Starship
Ride the Tiger, a book by Julius Evola
Ride the Tiger (film), a 1970 American film